Vote for Huggett is a 1949 British comedy film directed by Ken Annakin and starring Jack Warner, Kathleen Harrison, Susan Shaw and Petula Clark. Warner reprises his role as the head of a London family, in the post-war years.

In this, the third in the series of films about the Huggetts after Holiday Camp, in 1947, and Here Come the Huggetts (1948), Joe Huggett decides to run as a candidate in the municipal election. It was followed later in 1949 by The Huggetts Abroad.

Plot
After writing a letter to the local newspaper, calling for the construction of a pleasure garden for a new war memorial, Joe Huggett is overwhelmed by the response from the public. However, his call is awkward for a corrupt local councillor who has plans of his own for the space from which his business can profit. Other people see opportunities of their own in supporting Huggett's plan and he is persuaded to stand for election as a local councillor. In her efforts to help his campaign, Pet gets rather too enthusiastic. Meanwhile, Susan's love life gets complicated when her boyfriend Peter proposes marriage and then finds he has competition.

Cast
 Jack Warner as Joe Huggett, Father
 Kathleen Harrison as Ethel Huggett, Mother
 Susan Shaw as Susan Huggett
 Petula Clark as Pet Huggett
 David Tomlinson as Harold Hinchley
 Diana Dors as Diana Gowan
 Peter Hammond as Peter Hawtrey
 Amy Veness as Grandma Huggett
 Hubert Gregg as Maurice Lever
 John Blythe as Gowan
 Anthony Newley as Dudley
 Charles Victor as Mr Hall
 Adrianne Allen as Mrs Hall
 Frederick Piper as Bentley
 Eliot Makeham as Christie
 Clive Morton as Campbell, Huggett's boss
 Norman Shelley as Wilson
 Lyn Evans as Police Sergeant Pike
 Hal Osmond as Fishmonger
 Elizabeth Hunt as Mrs Lever
 Ferdy Mayne as Waiter
 Nellie Bowman - Eccentric Old Lady
 Empsie Bowman as Eccentric Old Lady
 Isa Bowman as Eccentric Old Lady

Critical reception
TV Guide described Vote for Huggett as "one of three films in the rather dismal 'Huggett Family' series". The Radio Times praised Jack Warner and Kathleen Harrison, "wonderful as mum and dad and yes, that's a young Diana Dors as the troublesome niece". The Monthly Film Bulletin wrote, "the film is well up to the standard set by the first in the series, and relies for its appeal on its homely humour and fine characterisations by Jack Warner and Kathleen Harrison as Joe and Ethel Huggett, Susan Shaw and Petula Clark as their daughters and Diana Dors as niece Diana. Strong support is rendered by the remainder of the cast."

References

External links
 
A Vote for Huggett at Letterbox DVD
Vote for Huggett at BFI
Complete film at Internet Archive

1949 films
Films directed by Ken Annakin
Gainsborough Pictures films
British black-and-white films
British comedy films
1949 comedy films
Films scored by Antony Hopkins
The Huggetts (film series)
Films about elections
1940s British films